Marek Špilár (11 February 1975 – 7 September 2013) was a Slovak football player. He won a national league title with MFK Košice in Slovakia as well as two in Belgium with Club Brugge KV. He also played club football in the Czech Republic and Japan.

Špilár was capped 30 times for the Slovak national team from 1997 to 2002.

Špilár died in September 2013 at the age of 38 when he committed suicide by jumping out of a fifth-floor flat window in the city of Prešov.

Club statistics

Honours
Club Brugge
Belgian Super Cup: 2005

References

External links

1975 births
2013 suicides
People from Stropkov
Sportspeople from the Prešov Region
Slovak footballers
Slovak expatriate footballers
Nagoya Grampus players
Expatriate footballers in Japan
J1 League players
Expatriate footballers in Belgium
Expatriate footballers in the Czech Republic
Belgian Pro League players
Club Brugge KV players
Czech First League players
FC Baník Ostrava players
SK Sigma Olomouc players
FC VSS Košice players
Slovak Super Liga players
Slovakia international footballers
Slovakia under-21 international footballers
FK Drnovice players
Slovak expatriate sportspeople in Japan
Suicides by jumping in Slovakia
Association football defenders
2013 deaths
1. FC Tatran Prešov players